The brown-capped tit-spinetail (Leptasthenura fuliginiceps) is a species of bird in the family Furnariidae. It is found in Argentina and Bolivia.

Its natural habitats are subtropical or tropical moist montane forests and subtropical or tropical high-altitude shrubland.

References

Leptasthenura
Birds of Argentina
Birds of Bolivia
Birds described in 1837
Taxonomy articles created by Polbot